Bale Mountains National Park (BMNP) is a national park in Ethiopia.

The park's Afromontane habitats have one of the highest incidences of animal endemicity of any terrestrial habitat in the world. The park was nominated to the World Heritage Tentative List  in 2009.

Geography
Bale Mountains National Park is located in southeastern Ethiopia, 400 km southeast of Addis Ababa and 150 km east of Shashamene in the Oromia Region National State. The boundary of the BMNP lies within five woredas (districts): Adaba (west), Dinsho (north), Goba (northeast), Delo-Mena-Angetu and Harena-Buluk (southeast). The park area is encompassed within geographical coordinates of 6º29' – 7º10'N and 39º28' – 39º57'E. The Bale Mountains are part of the Bale-Arsi massif, which forms the western section of the southeastern Ethiopian Highlands.

Hydrology 
The Bale Mountains play a vital role in climate control of the region by attracting large amounts of orographic rainfall, which has obvious implications for livestock and agricultural production. Some 600 - 1,000 mm fall annually in the lower altitude areas, while 1,000 - 1,400 mm fall in areas of higher altitude, and over 12 million people from Kenya, Somalia and Ethiopia are dependent on water from the Bale massif.

A total of 40 rivers rise in the BMNP area, contributing to five major rivers: the Web, Wabe Shebele, Welmel, Dumal and Ganale. Additionally, the Bale massif is the source for many springs in the lowlands, which are of paramount importance as they are the only source of water year-round. People living south of the national park are completely dependent on good management of the water resources from the highland areas. If the flow of these rivers is altered in any way – through deforestation, overgrazing of pastures and/or over abstraction for irrigation (all of which are occurring at present) – a highland/lowland imbalance results with loss of perennial water in the lowlands. If such a situation arises, the dry season range of the people and their livestock reduces dramatically and they concentrate about whatever water source remains. It is widely recognized that such uneven distribution of people and livestock leads to rapid and lasting degradation. The people are, therefore, likely to become increasingly food-aid dependent if the water catchment areas of the Bale Mountains are insufficiently protected. There is already evidence that over abstraction of water in the Bale Mountains is occurring.

Furthermore, two rivers emanating from Bale, the Wabe Shebele and Yadot, (tributary of the Ganale) have hydroelectric schemes. The dam on the Yadot River supplies electricity to Delo-Mena, while the dam on the Wabe Shebele provides electricity to the Bale area.

Lastly, there are numerous natural mineral water springs, locally called horas, which provide an essential source of minerals for livestock.  The mineral springs within the park are valued for their high mineral content (sodium, potassium, magnesium, zinc, and calcium), and local pastoralists believe that in order to maintain good health and milk production their livestock must be given hora water. They will drive their livestock for up to two days to reach the hora springs. It is increasingly apparent, however, that the hora springs have become an excuse for local people to enter the park to gain access to better grazing areas.

Climate 
Temperatures vary widely throughout BMNP: on the plateau, daytime temperatures are usually around 10 °C (50 °F) with strong winds; in the Gaysay Valley average daytime temperatures are around 20 °C (68 °F), and the Harenna Forest is around 25 °C (77 °F). However, the weather changes frequently and sometimes drastically. In elevations over 3,000 meters, night frosts are common. The rainy season is from May until November.

Ecology

Habitats 
The park is divided into five distinct and unique habitats: the Northern Grasslands (Gaysay Valley), Northern Woodlands (Park Headquarters), Afro-alpine Meadows (Sanetti Plateau), Erica Moorlands, and the Harenna Forest.

Surrounded by East African pencil juniper (Juniperus procera) trees and St. John’s wort, waist-high wildflowers and grasses grow in the Northern Grasslands and Woodlands. Tree heath (Erica arborea) is native to the Ethiopian montane moorlands ecoregion in the park.

The Afro-alpine moorlands of the Sanetti Plateau is the largest continuous area of its altitude on the entire continent of Africa. Carpeted in lichen covered rocks, and punctuated by Giant lobelia (Lobelia rynchopetalum) that grow to heights of up to 12 meters. The Plateau is also dotted with alpine lakes and streams, providing important resident wildlife resources, as well as wintering and passage stations for rare and regionally endemic birds.

The Harenna Forest plant community makes up about half of the park, a woodland of trees draped in moss and lichens that seem to drip off the branches. The area is frequently cloaked in fog, and wildlife is elusive.

Flora 

The forests of the Bale Mountains are important for genetic stocks of wild forest coffee (Coffea arabica) and for medicinal plants in Ethiopia. Three medicinal plant hotspots have been identified: two in the Gaysay area and one in the Angesu area, spanning the park boundary. The female flowers of hagenia contain anthelmintic, which is used to treat tapeworms among the local populations.

Fauna 

The Bale Mountains National Park is an important area for several threatened Ethiopian endemic species. Additionally, the park holds 26% of Ethiopia's endemic species including one primate, one bovid, one hare, eight rodent species, and the entire global population of the big-headed African mole-rat. There are also several rare and endemic amphibians.

Mammals
Mammal species in the Bale Mountains National Park include Ethiopian wolf (Canis simensis), Mountain nyala (Tragelaphus buxtoni), big-headed African mole-rat, Menelik's bushbuck, common duiker, klipspringer, Bohor reedbuck, Ethiopian highland hare, warthog, spotted hyena, serval, and the Bale Mountains vervet (Chlorocebus djamdjamensis).

Other mammals of Bale Mountains National Park located in Harenna forest include the African golden wolf, Giant forest hog, Mantled guereza, lion, African leopard, and African wild dog. Almost one-third of the 47 mammals that live in BMNP are rodents. The rodent community, particularly of the Afro-alpine plateau are keystone species in the Bale Mountains National Park. They are the main prey for Ethiopian wolves, and natural grazers of the Afro-alpine areas were important cryoturbation processes happen.

Avifauna
The Bale Mountains are home to over 282 species of birds, including nine of the 16 species endemic to Ethiopia. Furthermore, over 170 migratory birds have been recorded within the park. Bale Mountains National Park is home to almost every highland Abyssinian and Ethiopian endemic.

With over 863 species of birds recorded, representing approximately 9.5% of the world's bird diversity and 39% of the bird species in Africa, Ethiopia is often considered one of the most avifaunal-rich countries in Africa. Sixteen of Bale's bird species are endemic to Ethiopia.
Due to the diversity and density of rodents, the Bale Mountains are also an extremely important area for residents as well as wintering and passing raptors.
Ethiopian endemic birds in Bale Mountains include blue-winged goose (Cyanochen cyanoptera), spot-breasted lapwing (Vanellus melanocephalus), yellow-fronted parrot (Poicephalus flavifrons), Abyssinian longclaw (Macronyx flavicollis), Abyssinian catbird (Parophasma galinieri), Bale parisoma (Parisoma griseiventris), Ethiopian siskin (Serinus nigriceps), fawn-breasted waxbill (Estrilda paludicola), and the Abyssinian owl (Asio abyssinicus).

Herpetofauna
Ethiopian rare endemic reptiles that are newly discovered in the Bale Mountains forested areas include Ethiopian House snake (Lamprophis erlangeri), Ethiopian mountain adder (Bitis parviocula), Bale two-horned chameleon (Trioceros balebicornutus), Harenna hornless chameleon (Trioceros harennae), Beardless Ethiopian montane chameleon (Trioceros affinis), and Wolfgang Böhme's Ethiopian Chameleon (Trioceros wolfgangboehmei). 

At least 7 species of endemic Amphibians are discovered in forested swampy areas and Bale Mountains National park plateaus. Ethiopian burrowing tree frog (Leptopelis gramineus), Erlanger's Grassland frog (Ptychadena erlangeri) and Neumann's Grassland frog (Ptychadena neumanni) are commonly rare within these habitats. However, other amphibians species lives within the areas of Bale Mountains such as Bale Mountain Frog (Ericabatrachus baleensis), Ethiopian banana frog (Afrixalus enseticola), Ragazzi's tree frog (Leptopelis ragazzii), Kouni Valley striped frog (Paracassina kounhiensis), Malcolm's Ethiopian toad (Altiphrynoides malcolmi), Osgood's Ethiopian toad (Altiphrynoides osgoodi), and Bale Mountains tree frog (Balebreviceps hillmani) are considered to be endangered because of habitat loss and deforestation.

People of Bale 

The people of the region are dominantly Oromo-speaking farmers and cattle herders. The population of the entire Bale Zone is approximately 1.5 million. Afan Oromo is the official language of Oromia. It belongs to the Cushitic languages, and serves as a sort of lingua franca for over 25 million Oromos. However, most people in Bale Mountains speak some Amharic.

The predominant religion in the Bale Mountains is Muslim (77%), followed by Orthodox Christian (20%) and Protestant (1%).
The Bale Mountains are the true ancestral home of the Oromo, the largest single ethnic group in the Horn of Africa. Living as pastoralists and farmers, the population grew quite quickly and expanded to different corners of the country beginning in the 16th century.

Little is known about the Oromo people of the area and how they came to be there. They are part of the eastern Cushitic people stemming from a branch of the Caucasoid race (which includes Western Asians, Arabs and Europeans), and are distributed from Wello in Ethiopia's north, to Mombasa in Kenya to the south. Some 3,000 years ago, they passed on practices such as the initiation ceremony of circumcision and the habit of not eating fish to Nilotic peoples in the West. Furthermore, they incorporated the ideas of the Gadaa system and cattle husbandry into their own society. The Gadaa system is based on the principles of classifying a society into 11 functional grades, each of which has its special roles and statuses.

Currently, people subsist mainly on agriculture. They follow a traditional transhumance system known as the Godantu system, a key feature of traditional human use of the Bale Mountains. In this system, livestock, particularly cattle, are sent to higher grazing grounds during the months when crops are growing in lower altitudes or into the forest for shade during the dry season. However, this should not be confused with the cattle movements that are a consequence of the loss of grazing land outside of the park, thus forcing cattle into the park to graze.

Bale houses are circular in shape and locally referred to as “mana citaa”. Juniper and sometimes eucalyptus are used to make the walls and roof. The roof is covered with thatched grass cut from “citaa” (tussock grass) or stubble, especially barley, and supported by a wooden pillar, which stands in the middle of the floor. The house is divided into portions by walls made of bamboo or mud mixed with the stubble of barley or grass.

Threats 

Bale Mountains National Park is faced with many threats associated with an ever-developing and increasingly populated Ethiopia. One of the biggest threats to the park is grazing. For example, within the Web Valley, a prime Ethiopian wolf habitat, cattle density is estimated at 250 per square kilometer. Other threats include increasing settlements within the park. Currently, over 40,000 people live within the park's boundaries, increasing pressure on the natural resources of the area and diminishing natural habitats of wild animals. With these settlements come domestic dogs, which pose a great threat to the Ethiopian wolf. Dogs transmit rabies and canine distemper, and in 2010 killed 106 individuals (approximately 40% of the Bale population of Ethiopian wolves). Other serious threats include the use of the wolf habitat by livestock for grazing which significantly reduces the availability of rodent prey. Over 12 million people, their livestock, and the environment in the south of Ethiopia as well as neighboring Somalia and northern Kenya rely on the water that originates from the Bale massif. Unsustainable use and pollution are major threats. Conservationists suggest that if conservation efforts in the Bale Mountains are not successful and people continue to exploit the resources in an unsustainable way, more species of mammal would go extinct than in any other area of equivalent size on the planet.

See also

References

External links

Balemountains.org: Bale Mountains National Park
Call from the Wild.org: Bale Mountains National Park
Addis Tribune.com: The National parks of Ethiopia − Bale Mountains Park (Part I) 
Addis Tribune.com: The National parks of Ethiopia − Bale Mountains Park (Part II: Harena Forest)
Black-maned lion in Ethiopia

National parks of Ethiopia
•
Ethiopian Highlands
Protected areas of Oromia Region
Protected areas established in 1969
1969 establishments in Ethiopia
Important Bird Areas of Ethiopia
Ethiopian montane moorlands